Elections were held in Soccsksargen for seats in the House of Representatives of the Philippines on May 13, 2013.

The candidate with the most votes won that district's seat for the 16th Congress of the Philippines.

Summary

Cotabato
Cotabato was redistricted into three districts from two.

1st District
Jesus Sacdalan is the incumbent

2nd District
Incumbent 2nd district representative Nancy Catamco is running here. former representative Bernardo Piñol, Jr. is his main opponent.

3rd District
The third district covers the central part of the province. Senior Board Member Jose Tejada is running here.

Sarangani
Eight-division world boxing champion and incumbent Manny Pacquiao is running unopposed. He is co-nominated by his People's Champ Movement.

South Cotabato

1st District
Pedro Acharon is the incumbent. His opponent is Rogelio Pacquiao, if elected, he will join his brother Manny in the House separately

2nd District
Incumbent Daisy Fuentes is running for governor. Ferdinand Hernandez is her party's nominee.

Sultan Kudarat

1st District
Raden Sakaluran is the incumbent.

2nd District
Arnulfo Go is the incumbent.

 
 
 
 
 
 

2013 Philippine general election
Lower house elections in Soccsksargen